FC Lokomotiv-Pamir is a Tajik professional football club based in Dushanbe, that competes in the Tajikistan Higher League.

History
FC Lokomotiv-Pamir is a Tajik football club based in Dushanbe originally founded in 1961 as Lokomotiv Dushanbe. After initially being disbanded in the early 1990s, Lokomotiv Dushanbe were revived in early 1999 before again being disbanded at the end of 2000. Lokomotiv Dushanbe were resounded again in 2008, before merging with Pamir in 2017 to become Lokomotiv-Pamir.

Domestic history

Current squad

References

External links
 FFT Profile

Football clubs in Tajikistan
Football clubs in Dushanbe
Lokomotiv-Pamir